The enzyme 4a-hydroxytetrahydrobiopterin dehydratase catalyzes the chemical reaction

4a-hydroxytetrahydrobiopterin   6,7-dihydrobiopterin + H2O

This enzyme belongs to the family of lyases, specifically the hydro-lyases, which cleave carbon-oxygen bonds.  The systematic name of this enzyme class is 4a-hydroxytetrahydrobiopterin hydro-lyase (6,7-dihydrobiopterin-forming). Other names in common use include 4a-hydroxy-tetrahydropterin dehydratase, pterin-4α-carbinolamine dehydratase, and 4a-hydroxytetrahydrobiopterin hydro-lyase.

Structural studies

References

 

EC 4.2.1
Enzymes of known structure